André Gerhardus Venter (born 14 November 1970 in Vereeniging, South Africa) is a former South African rugby union footballer who earned 66 caps playing for the South Africa national team during the mid-to-late 1990s and early 2000s. He represented South Africa during the 1999 Rugby World Cup where they finished third.

A few years after his retirement he was diagnosed with a degenerative syndrome of the central nervous system, later revealed to be transverse myelitis, which causes damage to the spine, and forced him into a wheelchair. Later, his former Springbok teammate, Joost van der Westhuizen developed a degenerative nervous disease, amyotrophic lateral sclerosis.

International statistics

Test Match Record

Pld = Games Played, W = Games Won, D = Games Drawn, L = Games Lost, Tri = Tries Scored, Pts = Points Scored

Test tries (9)

World Cup matches
 Champions  Runners-up  Third place  Fourth place

See also
List of South Africa national rugby union players – Springbok no. 634

References

1970 births
Living people
People from Vereeniging
Afrikaner people
South African rugby union players
South Africa international rugby union players
Lions (United Rugby Championship) players
Free State Cheetahs players
Rugby union flankers
South Africa international rugby sevens players
Rugby sevens players at the 1998 Commonwealth Games
Commonwealth Games rugby sevens players of South Africa
Commonwealth Games competitors for South Africa
Rugby union players from Gauteng